Giulio Lamberti (16 December 1895 – 24 December 1985) was an Italian rower. He competed at the 1928 Summer Olympics in Amsterdam with the men's eight where they were eliminated in the quarter-final.

References

External links
 

1895 births
1985 deaths
Italian male rowers
Olympic rowers of Italy
Rowers at the 1928 Summer Olympics
Sportspeople from Piacenza
European Rowing Championships medalists